Douglas Alistair Glennie Grant (born 10 January 1938) is a Scottish retired amateur football wing half who made over 110 appearances in the Scottish League for Queen's Park. He represented Scotland at amateur level.

References

Scottish footballers
Scottish Football League players
Queen's Park F.C. players
Association football wing halves
1938 births
Living people
People from Elgin, Moray
Elgin City F.C. players
Scotland amateur international footballers
Sportspeople from Moray